The Optare Olympus (introduced in 2006 as the East Lancs Olympus, and sold as the Darwen Olympus between 2007 and 2008) is a double-decker bus built by Optare. It could be built as a body available on Alexander Dennis Enviro400, Volvo B9TL or Scania N230UD/N270UD chassis with the 2-axle and 3-axle variants. It is the double-decker equivalent of the Optare Esteem. Some 3-axle Olympus buses were built.

History
The Olympus was launched by East Lancashire Coachbuilders in November 2006. The first example, built on a Volvo B9TL chassis for Delaine Buses, was displayed at Euro Bus Expo 2006. It had been the intention to exhibit a higher specification model for Ham's of Flimwell, but this was not ready in time for the show, meaning the bus didn't show its full potential.

The Olympus replaced the OmniDekka on Scania chassis (though was still sold alongside the bus until 2011), which is 10.6 or 11.9 metres in length. On Volvo chassis, it replaced the Myllennium Vyking and the Myllennium Nordic. On Alexander Dennis chassis, it replaced the Myllennium Lolyne.

At the beginning of January 2007, Reading Buses ordered six Olympus with Scania chassis for their Loddon Bridge FastTrack park and ride contract to replace Optare Excels. They entered service in a yellow and blue livery in July 2007.

In London, some bus operators purchased Olympus with Scania chassis. Transdev London and Metroline had these buses operating on routes 148, 7 and 297 respectively. Due to problems with the new Transport for London specified air-conditioning units, some buses failed the tilt test by one degree, and entered service late.

Acquisition by Darwen 

East Lancs went into administration in August 2007 and was bought by the Darwen Group. The body was therefore renamed Darwen Olympus.

The first buses to be delivered under the Darwen name were those ordered by Cardiff Bus (one of which was shown at Coach and Bus live 2007) and Arriva Yorkshire.

Reading Buses has numerous examples bodied by Darwen, in addition to a few built by East Lancs before they went into administration.

Reverse takeover by Optare Olympus 
Following the reverse takeover of Optare by Darwen Group in June 2008, the Olympus was again renamed, becoming the Optare Olympus. London General ordered the Olympus with Alexander Dennis Enviro400 chassis instead of Scania which Metroline and Transdev London had inherited. Metrobus have 30 buses on Scania N230UD chassis, which were used on London routes 54 and 75

In 2009, Optare announced that it had designed its own chassis for the Optare Olympus, with a Mercedes-Benz engine, as per previous products. A single prototype integral Olympus, designated the Olympus O1030, was built; this later became the basis for the new Optare MetroDecker and was subsequently launched in 2014.

Open top variant

An open-top double-decker bus version of the Olympus, named the Visionaire, was also built. Like the Olympus, it was also built on the same chassis.

See also 

 List of buses

Competitors

 Alexander Dennis Enviro400
 Wright Eclipse Gemini

References

External links

Product brochure (East Lancs)
Product information (Darwen)
Product information (Optare)
Pictures of Delaine Buses' Olympus

Double-decker buses
Low-floor buses
Tri-axle buses
Olympus
Vehicles introduced in 2006